The 2022–23 Florida Gulf Coast Eagles women's basketball team represents Florida Gulf Coast University during the 2022–23 NCAA Division I women's basketball season. The Eagles, led by twenty-first year head coach Karl Smesko, played their home games at the Alico Arena and were members of the Atlantic Sun Conference.

Roster

Schedule
Source

|-
!colspan=6 style=| Non-conference regular season

|-
!colspan=6 style=| ASUN Regular Season

|-
!colspan=6 style=|ASUN Women's Tournament

|-
!colspan=6 style=| NCAA tournament

Rankings

*The preseason and week 1 polls were the same.^Coaches did not release a week 2 poll.

See Also
 2022–23 Florida Gulf Coast Eagles men's basketball team

References

Florida Gulf Coast
Florida Gulf Coast Eagles women's basketball seasons
Florida Gulf Coast Eagles women's basketball
Florida Gulf Coast Eagles women's basketball
Florida Gulf Coast